Sciocoris homalonotus is a species of shield bug belonging to the family Pentatomidae, subfamily Pentatominae. It is approximately 6–7 mm in size. The species was first described by Franz Xaver Fieber in 1851.

The apex of the chorion is more rounded in respect of Sciocoris microphthalmus Flor, 1860.

It can be found in most of Europe.

References

 Rider D.A., 2004 - Family Pentatomidae - Catalogue of the Heteroptera of the Palaearctic Region

External links
 BioLib
 Fauna Europaea

Sciocorini
Insects described in 1851
Hemiptera of Europe